Alban Uzoma Nwapa (born 26 August 1957), better known by his stage name Dr. Alban, is a Nigerian-Swedish recording artist and producer with his own record label, Dr. Records. His music can best be described as Eurodance/hip-hop reggae in a dancehall style. He has sold an estimated 16 million records worldwide and is most famous for his worldwide 1992 hit "It's My Life", from the album One Love.

Life and career

Early life
Alban was born Alban Uzoma Nwapa into a middle-class family of 10 children in Oguta, Imo state, Nigeria. He is Igbo.

Education
He got his secondary education at Christ The King College and spent most of his youth in his hometown  of Oguta. At age 23, he travelled to Sweden to study dentistry. To finance his studies, Dr. Alban became a DJ at the Stockholm club Alphabet Street. Very quickly, his name became widely known, especially since he often sang to the records he put on turntables. DJ René Hedemyr discovered him. Alban finished his studies and opened his own dentistry practice, keeping his DJ-ing as a lucrative sideline.

Denniz Pop and achieving success: 1990s
In 1990, he met Denniz Pop from the SweMix label and, together with Denniz and rap artist Leila K, released his first record Hello Afrika. At this point, he took the stage name Dr. Alban, a nod to his dental studies. His debut album included hits like "Hello Afrika" and "No Coke", both of which ended up being million-selling singles. The album itself was quite successful and earned him gold certification awards in numerous markets including Germany (for sales of over 250,000 units), Austria (25,000), and Switzerland (25,000).

One year later, this success was surpassed by his second album One Love. The album included European hit singles such as "It's My Life" (which was used as background music for a Tampax advert) and "Sing Hallelujah". The single "It's My Life" reached No.1 in Israel, Austria, the Netherlands, Sweden, and Germany, and No.2 in Norway, Switzerland, and the United Kingdom. The song "It's My Life" went platinum in Germany (for sales of over 500,000 units), in the Netherlands (75,000), and it sold over two million copies overall in Europe. The album in turn reached the top of the album chart in Austria and entered the top five in Switzerland, also reaching No.6 in Germany. It went gold in Germany (for sales of over 250,000 units) and platinum both in Austria and Switzerland (both 50,000).

Alban's third album Look Who's Talking!, released in 1994, hit the top 10 in numerous markets including Germany, Switzerland, and Austria. The album was the first to earn Alban a gold certification award in his home country of Sweden for sales of over 50,000 units.

Dr. Alban founded his own record label Dr. Records, whereon he released his 1996 album Born in Africa. The album was unable to match the success of his previous releases. It only reached No.12 in Finland, while it peaked at No.37 in Switzerland and Sweden, No.52 in Germany, and No.41 in Austria. The single "Born in Africa" went to number 1 in Finland.

In 1997, Alban released the compilation album The Very Best of 1990–1997, which only charted in Austria, Sweden, and Germany. The same year, the artist also released the studio album Believe, which peaked at No.27 in Sweden, No.30 in Finland, and No.41 in Austria. In late 1998, Dr. Alban released a single with German-based artist Sash!, entitled "Colour the World", which experienced moderate chart success in Europe.

Decline and return to music: 2000s
In 2000, Alban released the single "What Do I Do", which charted only in Sweden at No.43; it spent only two weeks on the charts there. The album Prescription was a flop as it failed to chart anywhere.

In 2007, after years of absence from the music scene, Dr. Alban released the studio album Back to Basics. It was sold on the internet only through Dr. Alban's official website. In Russia, however, physical CDs and cassettes were released.

Later activities: 2010s–present
In 2010, Alban collaborated once again with Sash! to produce a remake of "Hello Afrika", "Hello South Afrika", dedicated to the 2010 FIFA World Cup. It was followed by a single consisting of 16 remixes.

On 15 February 2014 at the Scandinavium arena in Gothenburg, Dr. Alban teamed up with Jessica Folcker and arrived in fifth place in the third heat of Melodifestivalen 2014, with the song "Around the World", to win the right to represent Sweden at the Eurovision Song Contest 2014 in Copenhagen, Denmark.

In 2015, he released the single "Hurricane", which failed to enter the European charts.

In May 2020, Alban released the song "Hello Sverige" (in Swedish) to encourage the population of Sweden to respect social distancing measures put in place to counteract the COVID-19 pandemic. The next month, he released an English version titled "Hello Nations". The song is another remake of his classic hit "Hello Afrika".

In June 2020, Alban released the single "Drama", also in Swedish, in collaboration with singer Folkhemmet. The song talks about Alban's long-running acrimonious relationship with Swedish tabloid journalists.

Personal life
Alban met his future wife, Swedish teacher Katrine Hermansson, in 2004, through footballer Tomas Brolin. The couple had two daughters together, Jane (2005) and Julia (2008). The relationship ended in 2021. Since his divorce, Alban has continued to live in Stockholm.

Discography

Studio albums

Compilations

Singles

As lead artist

As featured artist

References

External links

 
 Dr. Alban Records

1957 births
Living people
Igbo pop musicians
Swedish pop musicians
Eurodance musicians
Swedish electronic musicians
Swedish dance musicians
Musicians from Imo State
Nigerian emigrants to Sweden
Naturalized citizens of Sweden
Swedish dentists
Nigerian medical doctors
Nigerian reggae musicians
Nigerian male musicians
English-language singers from Sweden
Nigerian hip hop singers
Swedish hip hop musicians
Melodifestivalen contestants of 2014